K9 glass, sometimes referred to as K9 crystal, is a variety of optical borosilicate crown glass.  The letter "K" is a reference to the German word for "crown" (Krone) and the number 9 refers to the lead oxide content of the glass (9%).  K9 glass has high optical clarity, and is used in many contexts requiring this characteristic.  It has been regarded as a difficult-to-cut material because of its superior mechanical properties.  It has an elastic modulus per pascal of 8x1010, a Poisson's ratio of 0.21, and a density of 2510 kilograms per cubic meter (less dense than most other leaded glass).  Its high refractive index (for a leaded glass) and exceptional clarity combined with low cost have made it desirable for chandeliers, lasers, telescopes, etc.

K9 is produced in large quantities by China, which sells it at a price far below higher-quality well-known glass manufacturers such as Swarovski.  The US equivalent of K9 is BK7.

References

Glass types